Zhiming is the Mandarin Pinyin spelling of a Chinese male given name. The same name is also spelled Chih-ming in Mandarin Wade–Giles romanisation, and Chi-ming or Tsz-ming in Cantonese pronunciation. According to Taiwan's 2010 census, it was the second-most popular name for men, with 14,022 having the name. It may be roughly translated as "having a clear goal in life". It was one of a number of names with the character "" that began to become popular in the 1960s in Taiwan, an era when rising economic prosperity meant that parents hoped for their children to have more goals than simply making money.

People with this name include:
Dominic Chan Chi-ming (born 1952), Hong Kong Catholic priest, Vicar General of the Hong Kong Catholic Diocese
Chi Ming Chan (born 1949), Hong Kong chemical engineering professor
Chung Chi-ming (fl. 1960s), Hong Kong broadcaster
Fung Chi Ming (born 1951), Hong Kong football player
Chih-Ming Ho, Taiwan-born American engineering professor
Wang Zhiming (Christian) (1907–1973), Chinese pastor of Miao ethnicity
Wang Zhiming (fencer) (born 1964), Chinese fencer
Frankie Yick Chi-ming (born 1953), Hong Kong Legislative Council member

See also
Chinese given name
Ho Chi Minh, Vietnamese leader whose name is also written with these characters (see chữ nôm and hán tự)

References

Chinese masculine given names